Saint Rose de Viterbo Catholic Church is a Roman Catholic church in Longview, Washington, United States 
dedicated to Rose of Viterbo. It is  a part of Saint Rose Parish inside the Archdiocese of Seattle.  

The parish was established in 1927 to serve the catholic population of the city of Longview, which had been established in 1923. There were four mission churches at  Castle Rock, Cathlamet, Kalama, and Woodland, and a new wood-framed church was built for the parish by 1928.

References

External links

Roman Catholic churches in Washington (state)
Buildings and structures in Cowlitz County, Washington